Markus Eichler (born 18 February 1982 in Varel) is a German professional road bicycle racer, currently under contract to the German Team Stölting. He had originally signed for 2011 with the Australian team called Pegasus, but that team failed to secure a UCI license of any kind, leaving its riders to need to sign elsewhere.

Eichler left  at the end of the 2013 season, and joined Team Stölting for the 2014 season.

Palmares 

2006
1st Ronde van Drenthe
1st GP de Dourges
1st Rund um den Elm
1st Prix de Lillers
1st Köln-Schuld-Frechen
3rd Omloop van het Waasland
4th Nokere Koerse
6th Rund um Düren
7th De Vlaamse Pijl
2007
5th Nokere Koerse
8th Overall Three Days of De Panne
10th Halle–Ingooigem
2009
4th Le Samyn
2010
1st Profronde van Fryslan
2011
1st Prologue Flèche du Sud
5th Grote Prijs Stad Zottegem
7th Overall Azerbaijan International Cycling Tour
1st Stage 4
10th Dorpenomloop Rucphen
2013
2nd Ronde van Drenthe

References

External links 

1982 births
Living people
People from Varel
Cyclists from Lower Saxony
German male cyclists
Tour of Azerbaijan (Iran) winners